Steingrímsson is an Icelandic patronym, meaning son of Steingrímur. Notable people with the surname include:

Guðmundur Steingrímsson (born 1972), Icelandic politician
Héðinn Steingrímsson (born 1975), Icelandic chess grandmaster

Icelandic-language surnames
Patronymic surnames